The 1992–93 NCAA Division I men's basketball rankings was made up of two human polls, the AP Poll and the Coaches Poll, in addition to various other preseason polls.

Legend

AP Poll 
The final AP poll was released before the NCAA Tournament on March 14, 1993.

Coaches Poll 
The final Coaches poll was released after the NCAA Tournament to cap the 1992–93 season.

References 

1992-93 NCAA Division I men's basketball rankings
College men's basketball rankings in the United States